Susan Maggi is a Canadian film editor. She is a four-time Genie Award nominee and has also been nominated for three Gemini Awards and two Directors Guild of Canada for "Best Achievement in Picture Editing". Maggi is a member of the Canadian Cinema Editors Honors Society.

Recognition 
2013 Directors Guild of Canada Award for Best Achievement in Editing - World Without End - miniseries - Nominated -
2009 Gemini Award for Best Picture Editing in a Dramatic Program or Series - Being Erica - Nominated
2008 Genie Award for Best Achievement in Editing  - Poor Boy's Game - Nominated
2004 Directors Guild of Canada DGC Team Award Outstanding Team Achievement in a Family Feature Film - Goose on the Loose - Nominated 
2001 Genie Award for Best Achievement in Editing - New Waterford Girl - Nominated
2000 Gemini Award for Best Picture Editing in a Dramatic Program or Series - One Heart Broken Into Song - Nominated
1998 Gemini Award for Best Picture Editing in a Dramatic Program or Series - The Planet of Junior Brown - Nominated
1997 Genie Award for Best Achievement in Editing - The Boys Club - Nominated
1996 Genie Award for Best Achievement in Editing - Rude - Nominated

References

External links

Canadian film editors
Year of birth missing (living people)
Living people
Canadian women film editors